Thomas Monroe is a former American football player who played four seasons in the Arena Football League with the Pittsburgh Gladiators, Tampa Bay Storm and New Orleans Night. He played college football at Prairie View A&M University. In 1990, he was the AFL Ironman of the Year and also named First Team All-Arena.

References

Living people
Year of birth missing (living people)
Place of birth missing (living people)
American football wide receivers
American football defensive backs
African-American players of American football
Prairie View A&M Panthers football players
Pittsburgh Gladiators players
Tampa Bay Storm players
New Orleans Night players
21st-century African-American people